The Diocese of Baker (Latin: Dioecesis Bakeriensis) is a Latin Church ecclesiastical territory or diocese of the Catholic Church in Eastern Oregon, United States. It is a suffragan diocese in the ecclesiastical province of the metropolitan Archdiocese of Portland.

While the cathedral, Saint Francis de Sales Cathedral, is in the small city of Baker City, the pastoral offices are located in Bend, the largest city in Oregon outside the Willamette Valley. The Diocese of Baker "includes almost 67,000 square miles in Oregon and has a population of 526,760 people, of whom 34,375, or seven percent, are Catholic".

History
The "Diocese of Baker City" was established on June 19, 1903, and renamed "Diocese of Baker" on February 16, 1952.

Territory
The diocese consists of the counties of Baker, Crook, Deschutes, Gilliam, Grant, Harney, Hood River, Jefferson, Klamath, Lake, Malheur, Morrow, Sherman, Umatilla, Union, Wallowa, Wasco and Wheeler in Eastern Oregon.

Bishops

Bishops of Baker City 
 Charles Joseph O'Reilly (1903-1918)
 Joseph Francis McGrath (1918-1950)  - Leo Fabian Fahey (coadjutor bishop 1948–1950), died before succession
 Francis Peter Leipzig (1950-1952), title changed with title of diocese

Bishops of Baker 
 Francis Peter Leipzig (1952-1971)
 Thomas Joseph Connolly (1971-1999)
 Robert F. Vasa (2000-2011), appointed Coadjutor Bishop of Santa Rosa in California
 Liam Cary (2012–present)

Other priest of this diocese who became a bishop
 Elden Francis Curtiss, appointed Bishop of Helena in 1976 and later Archbishop of Omaha

See also

 Catholic Church by country
 Catholic Church in the United States
 Ecclesiastical Province of Portland in Oregon
 Global organisation of the Catholic Church
 List of Roman Catholic archdioceses (by country and continent)
 List of Roman Catholic dioceses (alphabetical) (including archdioceses)
 List of Roman Catholic dioceses (structured view) (including archdioceses)
 List of the Catholic dioceses of the United States

References

External links

Roman Catholic Diocese of Baker Official Site 
New Advent.org - Diocese of Baker City

 
Baker
Diocese of Baker
Christian organizations established in 1903
Baker
Baker City, Oregon
1903 establishments in Oregon